Alharbi El Jadeyaoui (born 8 August 1986) is a footballer who plays as a left winger. Born in France, he represented Morocco at international level.

Career

El Jadeyaoui was born in Strasbourg.

On 13 July 2009, it was announced by Sky Sports that El-Jadeyaoui had joined English Premier League side Blackburn Rovers for a one-week trial. On 20 July 2009, Guingamp signed the attacking midfielder from Stade Brest on a four-year deal. On 7 August 2013, it was announced that El-Jadeyaoui had joined English Premier League side Arsenal F.C. on a two-day trial.

On 22 January 2014, it was announced that El-Jadeyaoui signed a two-year contract for Ligue 2 side RC Lens.

In June 2015, El-Jadeyaoui moved to Azerbaijan Premier League Champions FK Qarabağ, signing a two-year contract.

On 5 January 2018, El-Jadeyaoui joined Championnat National side Grenoble. In the 2018-19 season, he played only 430 minutes of play in the league (including four starts) and on 25 July 2019 he announced the "end of his adventure" with the Grenoble.

In January 2020, he joined German Oberliga Baden-Württemberg club SV Linx.

International career
El Jadeyaoui was born in France to parents of Moroccan descent. He originally played for France U20 in the 2007 Toulon Tournament. He was then formally capped by Morocco national football team in a 2–1 win over Tanzania on 8 June 2013.

Career statistics

Honours
Qarabağ FK
Azerbaijan Premier League (1): 2015–16
Azerbaijan Cup: (1) 2015–16

References

External links
 Alharbi El Jadeyaoui profile at foot-national.com
 
 
 

1986 births
Living people
French sportspeople of Moroccan descent
Footballers from Strasbourg
Association football midfielders
Moroccan footballers
Moroccan expatriate footballers
French footballers
Morocco international footballers
France youth international footballers
Ligue 1 players
Ligue 2 players
Championnat National players
Azerbaijan Premier League players
AS Beauvais Oise players
Tours FC players
LB Châteauroux players
Stade Brestois 29 players
En Avant Guingamp players
Angers SCO players
RC Lens players
Qarabağ FK players
Grenoble Foot 38 players
Expatriate footballers in Azerbaijan
Expatriate footballers in Thailand
Expatriate footballers in Germany
Moroccan expatriate sportspeople in Azerbaijan
Moroccan expatriate sportspeople in Thailand
Moroccan expatriate sportspeople in Germany
French expatriate footballers
French expatriate sportspeople in Azerbaijan
French expatriate sportspeople in Thailand
French expatriate sportspeople in Germany